Glenswilly GAA (Irish: CLG Gleann tSúilí) is a GAA club based in Glenswilly, County Donegal, Ireland. Most noted for winning the Donegal Senior Football Championship in 2011, 2013 and 2016, the team has fielded players like All-Ireland winning captain Michael Murphy. The club's chairman is Michael Murphy.

History
The present club was founded in 1982. A teenage Manus McFadden arranged a meeting at Foxhall of Glenswillyites who were interested in forming a team, with Joe Kelly, Roger McDaid, Fr Eamon Crossan, Finbar Glackin, Jimmy Joe McGinley and chair Eddie McDevitt.

Glenswilly reached their first ever Senior county final in 2007, where they lost to near neighbours St Eunan's 0–12 to 1–3.

In 2011, they won the Donegal Senior Football Championship for the first time, with a 1–8 to 0–9 defeat of Naomh Mícheál in the final.

On 25 September 2012, the Donegal senior team—fresh from winning the 2012 All-Ireland Senior Football Championship Final—were scheduled to visit Glenswilly; however, the visit was postponed due to time constraints which arose due to the huge crowds around the county eager to catch a glimpse of the team. The team eventually visited Glenswilly on 27 September.

In 2013, the club rebuffed allegations that they forced children into GAA jerseys. Later that year they hosted the 2013 All-Ireland Football Series launch, held following confirmation of the four provincial winners. That year they won their second Donegal Senior Football Championship and progressed to the final of the Ulster Senior Club Football Championship, which they lost to Ballinderry.

The club won its third and final Donegal SFC in 2016.

By 2020, Neil Gallagher, Ciaran Bonner and Joe Gibbons (all three-time SFC winners) had retired.

Glenswilly's success at senior level is in stark contrast to that of nearby Termon, another little rural Donegal countryside club to have made head way at senior level in recent times. Termon and Glenswilly both operate in the shadow of St Eunan's; however, while Glenswilly responded to their 2007 Donegal Senior Football Championship Final loss by winning in 2011, Termon responded to their 2003 loss by losing the final again in 2008 and then sliding into Division 3 and the Intermediate Championship.

The club commemorated forty years in existence with a year-long event in 2022.

Non-playing personnel
Updated 16 July 2020

|}

Managers

Notable players

 Ciaran Bonner — 2007 NFL winner
 Neil Gallagher — 2007 NFL-winning captain and 2012 All-Ireland winner
 James Pat McDaid — Glenswilly senior team captain 2013
 Gary McFadden — member of the 2012 All-Ireland panel; Glenswilly senior team captain 2011, 2016
 Michael Murphy — 2012 All-Ireland winning captain

Other figures
 Manus Kelly — led Glenswilly to a Senior C Championship win in 2016
 Michael McGeehin — 2000 JFL trainer
 Shane Williams — Welsh rugby union player

Honours

Football
Ulster Senior Club Football Championship:
 Runner-up (1): 2013
Donegal Senior Football Championship:
 Winner (3): 2011, 2013, 2016
 Runner-up (2): 2007, 2014
Ulster Intermediate Club Football Championship:
 Runner-up (1): 2005
 Donegal Intermediate Football Championship:
 Winner (1): 2005
 Donegal Senior B Football Championship:
 Winner (1): 2015.                          
 Donegal Senior C Football Championship:
 Winners (2): 2016, 2017
  Donegal Junior A&B Football Championship:
 Runner-up (1): Junior A Finalists 2000
 Winner (1): Junior B Champions 1984
 Runner-up (1): Junior B Finalists 1988, 2014
Donegal All County League Divisions:
 Winner (2): Division Two 2007, 2013
 Winner (3): Division Four 1989, 1993, 2000
Comortas Peile Na Gaeltacht Tir Conaill:
 Winner (1): 2011

Other
Donegal Ladies Intermediate Football Championship:
 Winner (1): 2007
Donegal Ladies Junior Championship:
 Winner (1): 2006
Donegal Ladies Junior B Championship:
 Winner (1):''' 2017
 Runner-up (1) 2016

References

External links
 Glenswilly at gaainfo.com

1982 establishments in Ireland
Gaelic games clubs in County Donegal
Gaelic football clubs in County Donegal